Callicarpa lanata is a scientific name which may refer to two different plants

Callicarpa lanata  is a synonym of Callicarpa vestita
Callicarpa lanata  is an illegitimate name for Callicarpa tomentosa